Cheiloxya is a genus of beetles in the family Cicindelidae, containing the following species:

 Cheiloxya binotata (Castelnau, 1833)
 Cheiloxya longipennis W. Horn, 1891

References

Cicindelidae